is a Japanese manga written and illustrated by Satomi Sugita. It is licensed in North America by Digital Manga Publishing which released the manga on 26 August 2008.

Reception
Rachel Bentham, writing for Active Anime, felt Candy was "explicit without being too graphic and attractive for its tender-hearted characters and bon-vivant tone." Leroy Douressaux praised the varied character designs and the amount of humour in the work, which he felt was enough to lighten the mood. Danielle Van Gorder, writing for Mania Entertainment, appreciated the reactions of the "various townfolk" to Takara, saying that this helped create a sense of "depth" to the world.

References

2007 manga
Yaoi anime and manga
Digital Manga Publishing titles